Acanthobrama marmid, or the Mesopotamian bream or Tigris bream, is a species of freshwater fish in the family Cyprinidae. It is widespread and abundant in the Tigris–Euphrates river system. It lives in many kinds of lowland waters, and can also tolerate modified water bodies such as reservoirs and moderately-polluted rivers.

It can grow up to a length of 30 cm. It is caught commercially but is of low value.

References

marmid
Fish described in 1843
Fauna of Iraq
Freshwater fish of Western Asia